David Breitel Zabel is an American television producer and writer. He has worked extensively on ER, becoming an executive producer and the series' showrunner. He has won a Humanitas Prize for his writing for ER.  He was also the showrunner/executive producer of the PBS series Mercy Street.

Early life
Zabel was raised in New York City.  He attended Princeton University and New York University's Graduate Acting Program at the Tisch School of the Arts.

Career
Zabel began his scriptwriting career with episodes for JAG and Star Trek: Voyager. He then became the story editor for the first season of Dark Angel in 2000 while continuing to write teleplays. In 2001, Zabel joined the crew of ER as an executive story editor and was promoted to co-executive producer later that season. He was made executive producer partway through the tenth season and took on the role of showrunner for the eleventh season. As a credited writer, Zabel contributed to over 45 scripts for ER.

Zabel and R. Scott Gemmill were awarded the Humanitas Prize in the 60 minutes category in 2007 for their script for the season 12 episode "There Are No Angels Here", which followed doctors from the Chicago-set series performing aid work in a refugee camp in Darfur. Humanitas stated that the prize was awarded for the episode's "unflinching look at the brutality inherent in civil wars and its belief that heroism is complex, complicated and multi-layered."

Zabel led the show through the 2007 Writers Guild of America Strike and picketed along with the rest of the writing team. Thirteen episodes were written prior to the strike, and new episodes were written once the strike was resolved, so Zabel was able to deliver a shortened 19 episode season.

Zabel was the showrunner/executive producer of "ER" through the end of its run, after 15 seasons, in 2009.  He was nominated for a second Humanitas Prize for writing the episode "Heal Thyself," which he also directed.  He was the showrunner of Detroit 1-8-7 in 2010-2011, for which he also wrote and directed numerous episodes.

In 2013, he had two pilots that he wrote and produced go to series on ABC - Lucky 7 (co-written with Jason Richman) and Betrayal. He served as executive producer and showrunner on both shows.

In 2016, the first season of his PBS series Mercy Street aired. The second season was released on January 22, 2017, being cancelled on March 9 of that year.

Filmography

References

External links
 

1966 births
Living people
American television writers
American male television writers
Tisch School of the Arts alumni